is a railway station on the Sanin Main Line in Ōda, Shimane Prefecture, Japan, operated by West Japan Railway Company (JR West).

Lines
Yunotsu Station is served by the Sanin Main Line.

Adjacent stations

History
The station opened on 25 November 1918. With the privatization of Japanese National Railways (JNR) on 1 April 1987, the station came under the control of JR West.

See also
 List of railway stations in Japan

External links

  

Railway stations in Japan opened in 1918
Railway stations in Shimane Prefecture
Sanin Main Line